The 2017 Arkansas Razorbacks baseball team represents the University of Arkansas in baseball at the Division I level in the NCAA for the 2017 NCAA Division I baseball season.  They play their home games at Baum Stadium and are coached by Dave van Horn.

Schedule and results

Record vs. conference opponents

Rankings

References

Arkansas
Arkansas Razorbacks baseball seasons
Arkansas baseball
Arkansas